Margaret Mary Leigh (17 December 1894 – 7 April 1973) was an English writer who lived extensively in Scotland and wrote about life in crofting communities. She was born in London, England, the cousin of novelist Dorothy L. Sayers and the daughter of an Oxford don, and educated at Somerville College, Oxford.

Early career
Leigh spent many of her early years travelling abroad for her father’s health. At various times, she acted as a governess, teacher and university lecturer. She eventually supported herself and her mother by subsistence farming, first in Cornwall, and later in Scotland.

Writing career
Leigh published a short book of poetry in 1923, Songs from Tani's Garden, before writing her first novel, The Passing of the Pengwerns, in 1924. Harvest of the Moor recounts her experience farming in Cornwall. In 1939, Leigh rode a horse from Cornwall to Scotland, which became the subject of her third book, A Kingdom for a Horse. She subsequently settled there, living variously at the Isle of Barra, Aultgrishan in Ross-shire, Fernaig in Ross-shire, Smirisary in Moidart and Inverness. Three of her books relate her experience in crofting communities in north-west Scotland before, during and just after World War II.

Works

Last days
In 1948, Margaret Leigh converted to Catholicism and in 1950 entered a convent. She died in Inverness, Scotland in 1973.

Sources 

Agriculture in Scotland
1894 births
1973 deaths
English women poets
English women novelists
20th-century English poets
20th-century English novelists
20th-century English women writers
Writers from London
First women admitted to degrees at Oxford
Alumni of Somerville College, Oxford